The 22nd World Science Fiction Convention (Worldcon), also known as Pacificon II, was held on 4–7 September 1964 at the Hotel Leamington in Oakland, California, United States.

Pacificon was combined with Westercon, the annual West Coast Science Fantasy Conference, sharing guests of honor and chairmen. The chairmen were J. Ben Stark and Al haLevy.

Participants 

Approximately 523 people attended.

Guests of Honor 
 Leigh Brackett (pro)
 Edmond Hamilton (pro)
 Forrest J Ackerman (fan)
 Anthony Boucher (toastmaster)

Awards

1964 Hugo Awards 

 Best Novel: Way Station by Clifford D. Simak
 Best Short Fiction: "No Truce with Kings" by Poul Anderson
 Best Professional Artist: Ed Emshwiller
 Best Professional Magazine: Analog
 Best Amateur Magazine: Amra, edited by George Scithers
 Best SF Book Publisher: Ace Books

See also 

 Hugo Award
 Science fiction
 Speculative fiction
 World Science Fiction Society
 Worldcon

References

External links 

 NESFA.org: The Long List
 NESFA.org: 1964 convention notes 
 Hugo.org: 1964 Hugo Awards

1964 conferences
1964 in California
1964 in the United States
Science fiction conventions in the United States
Worldcon